The Men's 1500 Freestyle swimming event at the 2009 SEA Games was held on December 13, 2009. It was a timed-final event.

Results

Final

References

Swimming at the 2009 Southeast Asian Games